Olya in Iran may refer to:
 Olya, Fars
 Olya, Tehran
 Olya Rural District, in Isfahan Province

See also
 Olya, meaning "Upper", is a common element in Iranian place names; see